Bergidora is a genus of beetles in the family Buprestidae, containing the following species:

 Bergidora bruchi (Obenberger, 1932)
 Bergidora picturella (Kerremans, 1887)

References

Buprestidae genera